These are the New Territories East results of the 2016 Hong Kong Legislative Council election. The election was held on 4 September 2016 and all 9 seats in New Territories East where consisted of North District, Tai Po District, Sai Kung District and Sha Tin District were contested. The anti-establishment camp secured 6 of the 9 seats with Leung Kwok-hung narrowly defeated independent Christine Fong for the last seat by 1,051 votes. Neo Democrats' Gary Fan lost re-election while James Tien failed to get his young party colleague Dominic Lee elected. In return, localist group Youngspiration convenor Baggio Leung and New People's Party–Civil Force barrister Eunice Yung took a seat respectively.

Overall results
Before election:

Change in composition:

Candidates list

Opinion polling

See also
Legislative Council of Hong Kong
Hong Kong legislative elections
2016 Hong Kong legislative election

References

2016 Hong Kong legislative election